Vartija (Finnish: Guardian) is a quarterly Finnish language theological magazine based in Helsinki, Finland. It was published in print between 1888 and 2017 and became an online-only periodical in 2017. The magazine is not attached to any church in Finland and supports both conservatism and radicalism since its establishment.

History and profile
Vartija was founded in 1888 by a group of young priests who had left the Finnish Lutheran Church, including Elis Bergroth, Karl August Hildén and Aleksander Auvinen. The founding editor was Elis Bergroth who served in the post from 1888 to 1906, and he was succeeded by Lauri Ingman. One of the topics covered in the magazine between 1888 and 1910 was the Finnish-American ecclesiastical conditions. In 1911 and 1913 the magazine published articles by Antti J. Pulkkinen and Aukusti Oravala concerning the work by Danish philosopher and theologian Søren Kierkegaard. During World War II Vartija became a church discussion forum. In 1965 Vicar Mauno Mäkinen published an article in the magazine suggesting that Finnish Christians should read the work by Richard W. Solberg.

Irja Askola was the first female editor-in-chief of Vartija who appointed to the post in 1982 along with Simo Knuuttila. As of 2018 the editors-in-chief were Matti Myllykoski and Mikko Ketola. The magazine publishes articles on a wide variety of topics such as religion, theology, philosophy, psychology, culture and society.

References

External links

1888 establishments in Finland
2017 disestablishments in Finland
Christian magazines
Defunct magazines published in Finland
Finnish-language magazines
Independent magazines
Magazines established in 1888
Magazines disestablished in 2017
Magazines published in Helsinki
Online magazines with defunct print editions
Quarterly magazines published in Finland